Hibbertia tenuifolia, commonly known as narrow-leaved guinea flower, is a species of flowering plant in the family Dilleniaceae and is endemic to eastern Australia. It is a small, spreading shrublet with hairy foliage, linear leaves and yellow flowers with twelve to sixteen stamens on one side of two carpels.

Description
Flowering occurs from October to December.

Taxonomy
Hibbertia tenuifolia was first formally described in 2000 by Hellmut R. Toelken in the Journal of the Adelaide Botanic Gardens from specimens collected by Leslie Pedley between Wyberba and Wallangarra in 1963. The specific epithet (tenuifolia) means "slender-leaved".

Distribution and habitat
This hibbertia grows in heath, woodland and forest in south-eastern Queensland and the Northern Tablelands of New South Wales, but is only known from three old collection.

Conservation status
Hibbertia tenuifolia is listed as "endangered" under the New South Wales Government Biodiversity Conservation Act 2016 and may be extinct in New South Wales.

See also
List of Hibbertia species

References

tenuifolia
Flora of New South Wales
Flora of Queensland
Plants described in 2000
Taxa named by Hellmut R. Toelken